San Miguel Alab Pilipinas (under the corporate name Pilipinas Basketball Club, Inc. or PBCI) is a Filipino professional basketball team which formerly played in the ASEAN Basketball League (ABL) under the sponsorship of San Miguel Corporation. The team is owned and managed by the sports talent management firm, Virtual Playground, headed by talent agents Dondon Monteverde and Charlie Dy. Alab Pilipinas is the fourth Philippine team to play in the ABL. "Alab" is a Filipino word that translates as "blaze" in English.

The team was originally known as Alab Pilipinas (2016-17 ABL season) as the fourth ABL team from the Philippines. From November 2017 to January 2018, it was known as Tanduay Alab Pilipinas, under the sponsorship of Tanduay Distillers, Inc.

History

Six of its original players are ABL veterans who had previously played for the Champion team San Miguel in the 2013 ABL season. The team staged their home games in venues located in Biñan, Laguna, Cebu, and Davao during the entire duration of their first season. They organized several basketball clinics together with the local government units as part of the basketball grassroots development program.

The team was sponsored by liquor brand Tanduay and played as Tanduay-Alab Pilipinas from November 2017 to January 2018. On February 1, 2018, San Miguel Corporation took over as the team's sponsor and was renamed San Miguel Alab Pilipinas. The sudden separation with Tanduay came about reportedly due to differences between the two parties in the handling of the team.

Final roster

Head coaches

Notable players 
Note: Players mentioned below are recipients of ABL awards or recognitions ONLY.

Team results

Home arena

Unlike other teams in the ABL, Alab Pilipinas doesn't have a primary venue. Instead, it tours around the Philippines, mostly in the Mega Manila, with select games elsewhere.

The team hosted all but one of their 2018 ABL Playoffs games at the Santa Rosa Multi-Purpose Complex in Santa Rosa, Laguna.

Current (for the 2018–19 ABL season)
 Caloocan Sports Complex, Caloocan
 Filoil Flying V Centre, San Juan
 Hoops Dome, Lapu-Lapu
 Lapu Lapu Sports Complex, Lapu-Lapu
 Santa Rosa Multi-Purpose Complex, Santa Rosa, Laguna (primary venue)
Former
 Alonte Sports Arena, Biñan, Laguna
 Baliuag Star Arena, Baliuag, Bulacan
 Davao City Recreation Center, Davao City
 Mall of Asia Arena, Pasay
 Olivarez College Gym, Parañaque
 University of Southeastern Philippines Gym, Davao City
 Ynares Center, Antipolo, Rizal

See also
San Miguel Beermen (ABL), basketball team owned by the San Miguel Corporation that played in the ABL.

References

External links
 ABL Page

 
ASEAN Basketball League teams
Basketball teams established in 2016
2016 establishments in the Philippines
Basketball teams in the Philippines
San Miguel Corporation